is a monorail station on the Osaka Monorail located in Ibaraki, Osaka, Japan.

Lines
Osaka Monorail Saito Line (Station Number: 53)

History
March 19, 2007 – Station begins operation as the Saito Line extension from Handai-byoin-mae to Saito-nishi opens

Layout
There is an island platform with two tracks.

Adjacent stations 

	

Ibaraki, Osaka
Osaka Monorail stations
Railway stations in Japan opened in 2007